Alfonso Quiñónez Molina (January 11, 1874 – May 22, 1950) was the  President of El Salvador from 21st of December 1918 to the 28th of February 1919 and from the 1st of March 1923 to 28th ofFebruary 1927.

He served as the Vice President of Carlos Meléndez and Jorge Meléndez from March 1915 to March 1923.

Early life
Alfonso was born into the family of Lucio Quiñónez and Aurelia Molina. 
He was married to Leonor Meléndez Ramírez,  who was a sister of the presidents Carlos and Jorge Meléndez.

Political career

The Meléndez-Quiñónez dynasty effectively ruled the country from 1914 to 1927. Quiñónez was one of the founders of the Democratic Party of El Salvador. His policies largely served the interests of the coffee oligarchy of the country.

In 1918, Quiñónez established the Lega Rojas, or the Red league, which intended to work as a mediator between the oligarchy and the peasants. It was deemed as the first attempt to form an official party in the country. However, the far-reaching oligarchic control of the prevented the organization from achieving its goal. Later it supported the candidacy of President Jorge Melendez.

After becoming president in 1923, Quiñónez ruled El Salvador like a ruthless dictator, harassing and suppressing any form of opposition.

It was common among Salvadoran presidents to declare an heir during the final days of their terms, as the constitution barred immediate re-election.

Quiñónez handed the presidency to Vice-president Romero. He thought that as Romero did not spring from a rich family, he would be a puppet of Quiñónez. However, Quiñónez's plan backfired, and he, along with other members of the dynasty organized a coup against the new president. But, the coup, which took place in December 1927, ultimately failed.

Quiñónez's decision to borrow money from other countries to pave the roads of San Salvador sparked controversy in the country, and this controversy was exploited by subsequent rulers,  like Maximiliano Hernández Martinez.

References

1874 births
1950 deaths
People from Cuscatlán Department
Presidents of El Salvador
Vice presidents of El Salvador
20th-century Salvadoran politicians